Joseph Vogel is an American author, scholar, and popular culture critic. He is the author of several books, including Man in the Music: The Creative Life and Work of Michael Jackson and This Thing Called Life: Prince, Race, Sex, Religion, and Music.

Career

Vogel writes about music, literature, film and popular culture. His critically acclaimed 2011 book, Man in the Music: The Creative Life and Work of Michael Jackson, was described by the Associated Press as "a fascinating read and really a must have for any fan of Jackson." Filmmaker Spike Lee characterized it as having "brilliantly cracked the DNA, the code, the artistry of Michael Joseph Jackson." Vogel's work has been featured in The Atlantic, The Huffington Post, and PopMatters. In 2013, he was ranked #15 by Sonifly in a list of "Most Influential Music Journalists in Social Media."

Vogel has published several books, including This Thing Called Life: Prince, Race, Sex, Religion, and Music, James Baldwin and the 1980s: Witnessing the Reagan Era and The Obama Movement. He has appeared in several documentaries, including Spike Lee's Bad 25 (film) and Michael Jackson's Journey from Motown to Off the Wall. Vogel received his PhD from the
University of Rochester, and was the associate professor and Chair of the English Dept. at Merrimack College in Massachusetts.  He now is the owner and founder of outdoor apparel company Timpanogos Hiking Company.

Biography

Vogel made national headlines in 2004 when, as Student Vice President of Academics at Utah Valley University, he invited film maker Michael Moore to speak on campus. The invitation incited an uproar amongst the predominantly conservative Utah County community. Vogel subsequently wrote a book about the experience entitled Free Speech 101; the book became a 2007 Independent Publisher Book Award Finalist. An award-winning documentary, This Divided State (in which Vogel appears), also recounts the story of Michael Moore's controversial visit to Utah Valley.

Published works

Notes

External links
Joseph Vogel Official web site
https://www.timpanogoshiking.com/

1981 births
American music critics
American music journalists
Writers from Rochester, New York
Utah Valley University alumni
University of Rochester
Living people

it:Joseph Vogel